Orienthella is a genus of sea slugs, specifically aeolid nudibranchs, marine gastropod molluscs in the family Coryphellidae.

Species
Species within the genus Orienthella are as follows:

 Orienthella cooperi (Cockerell, 1901)
 Orienthella fogata (Millen & Hermosillo, 2007)
 Orienthella trilineata (O'Donoghue, 1921) – type species

References

External links
 

Coryphellidae
Gastropod genera